Miniussi is a surname. Notable people with the surname include:

Christian Miniussi (born 1967), Argentine tennis player 
Ferdinando Miniussi (1940–2001), Italian footballer